Hanlon is a surname often associated with, but not necessarily tied to, the O'Hanlon Sept. The name may denote: 

 Alf Hanlon (1866–1944), New Zealand lawyer
 Darren Hanlon, Australian folk musician
 George Hanlon, Australian horse trainer 
 Glen Hanlon, Canadian ice hockey player and coach
 Jack P. Hanlon, Irish priest and artist 
 John Hanlon (record producer), American record producer and recording engineer
John J. Hanlon, American Catholic priest
 John Hanlon (singer), New Zealand singer-songwriter
 Michael Hanlon (1964–2016), British science writer
 Ned Hanlon (politician), Australian politician
 Ned Hanlon, American baseball manager
 Paul Hanlon, Scottish football player
 Philip J. Hanlon, American mathematician and President of Dartmouth College
 Richie Hanlon, fictional character from the TV series Oz
 Ritchie Hanlon, English football player and manager
 Tommy Hanlon Jr, Australian television personality

See also
 Hannon
 O'Hanlon
 Hanlon's razor

References
 'The O'Hanlons of Orior 1558-1691:Part II, Joseph Canning, Seanchas Ard Mhacha'', 19, #1, pp.111-129, 2002.